Inglis may refer to:

Companies and organizations
 A. & J. Inglis, a shipbuilding company
 John Inglis and Company, a Canadian company now a subdivision of Whirlpool Corporation
 William Inglis and Sons, bloodstock auctioneers

Places
 Inglis County, New South Wales
 Inglis Island, an island of Australia
 Inglis, Manitoba, an unincorporated community in Canada
 Inglis River, a river in northwest Tasmania
 Inglis, Florida, a town in the United States

Other uses
 Inglis (surname)
 Early Scots or 
 pertaining to England, English people, English language (English) or

See also
 Englis (disambiguation)
 Ingles (disambiguation)